Replacement level can refer to:

Replacement level in baseball, see value over replacement player
Replacement-level fertility, in human reproduction